Lanco is a city and commune in southern Chile administered by the  Municipality of Lanco.

Demographics
Of these, 10,383 (68.7%) lived in urban areas and 4,724 (31.3%) in rural areas. Between the 1992 and 2002 censuses, the population grew by 9.8% (1,350 persons).

Transport

The highway Chile Route 5 passes by Lanco.

Administration
As a commune, Lanco is a third-level administrative division of Chile administered by a municipal council, headed by an alcalde who is directly elected every four years. The 2008-2012 alcalde is Luis Cuvertino Gómez (PS).

Within the electoral divisions of Chile, Lanco is represented in the Chamber of Deputies by Alfonso De Urresti (PS) and Roberto Delmastro (RN) as part of the 53rd electoral district, together with Valdivia, Mariquina, Máfil and Corral.

References

External links
  Municipality of Lanco

Populated places in Valdivia Province
Communes of Chile
Populated places established in 1917